Lāsma Kugrēna (born 1952 in Bauska)  is a Latvian actress.

Theatre credits

External links

References 

1952 births
Living people
Latvian stage actresses
20th-century Latvian actresses
21st-century Latvian actresses
People from Bauska